The Montezuma's Revenge was a 24-hour ultra-endurance mountain bike wilderness race held in Colorado each August from 1986 until 2006. Competitors were required to climb a  mountain-Gray's Peak. The course varied from year to year but was always extremely demanding.  The winner was determined by who covers the most distance in the 24-hour period. Current course records:  
 Female Jari Kirkland in 2004 -  -  climbed
 Male Josh Tostado in 2005 -  covered -  climbed

Results

External links
 Facebook Group

Mountain biking events in the United States
Endurance games
Cycle races in the United States
Defunct cycling races in the United States